Æthelburh may refer to any of the following Anglo-Saxon women:
 Saint Æthelburh of Barking (died after 686/688), abbess of Barking 
 Saint Æthelburh of Faremoutiers (died 664), princess and abbess
 Saint Æthelburh of Kent (died 647), queen consort of Northumbria
 Saint Æthelburh of Wilton (died 810), abbess of Wilton

Old English given names
Feminine given names